Slovenia competed at the 2019 World Athletics Championships held in Doha, Qatar, from 27 September to 6 October 2019. The country was represented by nine athletes, seven women and two men.

Results

Key
Q = Qualified for the next round
q = Qualified for the next round as a fastest loser or, in field events, by position without achieving the qualifying target
NR = National record
PB = Personal best
SB = Season's best
N/A = Round not applicable for the event

Men
Track and road events

Field events

Women
Track and road events

Field events

References

Nations at the 2019 World Athletics Championships
World Championships in Athletics
Slovenia at the World Championships in Athletics